Federal Point is an unincorporated community in Putnam County, Florida, United States, located northwest of Hastings, on the eastern bank of the St. Johns River.

Geography

Climate

References

Unincorporated communities in Putnam County, Florida
Unincorporated communities in Florida
Former municipalities in Florida